Fe'ao Moe Lotu Vunipola (born 6 January 1969) is a Tongan former international rugby union player who participated at the 1995 Rugby World Cup and 1999 Rugby World Cup. He is the father of Mako Vunipola and Billy Vunipola, and is married to Rev. Iesinga Vunipola, Methodist minister and chaplain to the UK Tongan community.
He moved to Wales in 1998 to sign with Pontypool, and in 1999 joined up with Pontypridd. He left to join neighbours Caerphilly in 2001.

References

1969 births
Living people
Tongan rugby union players
Tonga international rugby union players
Tongan expatriate rugby union players
Expatriate rugby union players in Wales
Tongan expatriate sportspeople in Wales
Rugby union hookers
Tongan emigrants to England